Hackney Downs School was an 11–16 boys, community comprehensive secondary school in Lower Clapton, Greater London, England. It was established in 1876 and closed in 1995. It has been replaced by the Mossbourne Community Academy.

History

Grocers' Company's School
It was founded in 1876 as The Grocers' Company's School. On its transfer to the London County Council in 1906 the school was renamed Hackney Downs School (formerly the Grocers' Company's School).

Grammar school
Alumni including Nobel prize-winning playwright Harold Pinter, fellow playwright and actor Steven Berkoff, 1960s tycoon John Bloom and nutritionist John Yudkin. Two current members of the House of Lords are former pupils: (Lord Levy and Lord Clinton-Davis). The school had 600 boys with a sixth-form entry by the early 1970s. Former high jumper and Board Director of London 2012 Olympics Bid Team Dalton Grant attended Hackney Downs School in the 80s.

Comprehensive
It voted to become comprehensive in 1969,  and in September it became a comprehensive school.  By the time of its closure, over 70 percent of the boys spoke English as a second language, half came from households with no-one in employment, and half the intake had reading ages three years below average.

Decline and closure
Things came to a head in the 1990s, when the school made national news by being described by the then Conservative government as the 'worst school in Britain'.  Eventually, as a result of direct government pressure, the school was forced to close in 1995.

Later use of the building
The site of the old school is now occupied by Mossbourne Community Academy, founded by Sir Clive Bourne, which opened in 2004.  The school buildings of both the original Grocers' Company's School and Hackney Downs School have gone.

Old boys
The Old Boys of Hackney Downs continue their interactions as alumni through the Clove Club, which meets regularly, has its own website, and sponsors an email group called The Clove eGroup (on Yahoo), and featured on The Clove Club website.

History of the school
An official history of the school was published by the Clove Club in 1972. An updated edition was published in 2012: Hackney Downs 1876-1995: The Life and Death of a School.

Headmasters
John Kemp
https://www.thetimes.co.uk/article/john-kemp-headmaster-of-hackney-downs-school-6xrmsp2hph0

Notable alumni

Hackney Downs School (1974–95)
 Dalton Grant, high jumper
 Geoffrey Hanks, professor of palliative care medicine
 Metin Hüseyin, film and television director
  Eric Hollingsworth, Head Coach, Australian Athletics

Boys' grammar school (1906–74)
 Lazarus Aaronson, poet
 Geoffrey Alderman, historian
 Arnold Allen CBE, chief executive 1982–84 of the United Kingdom Atomic Energy Authority
 Sir Edward Bairstow, organist of York Minster 1913–46, composer (attended 1889–91)
 Alexander Baron, writer
 Morris Beckman
 Steven Berkoff, actor, playwright, director
 Gerald Bernbaum, Vice-Chancellor 1993–2001 of London South Bank University, and Professor of Education 1974–93 at the University of Leicester
 Mike Berry, singer and actor
 John Bloom, 1960s tycoon
 Eric Bristow, world champion darts player
 Air Vice-Marshal Reggie Bullen CB GM 
 Sir Stanley Burnton, Lord Justice of Appeal and Fellow of St Edmund Hall, Oxford
 Sir Michael Caine (Maurice Joseph Micklewhite, Jr.), CBE, actor (attended 1944–45, evacuated to King's Lynn during World War II)
 Roland Camberton, writer
 Frank Cass, publisher.
 Stanley Clinton Davis, Baron Clinton-Davis, Labour MP 1970–83 for Hackney Central
Paul Dean CB, Director National Physical Laboratory  1977-90
 Prof David Dolphin, OC, FRS, chemist, inventor of Visudyne, winner of Canada's Hertzberg Medal Home
 Prof Cyril Domb, physicist, Professor of Theoretical Physics 1954–81 at King's College London
 Maurice Evans (actor)
 Basil Feldman, Baron Feldman
 Frederic Sutherland Ferguson, bibliographer
 Abram Games OBE, graphic designer
 Arthur Gold CBE, chairman 1988–92 of the British Olympic Association
Michael Goldstein CBE, Vice-Chancellor of Coventry University 1992–2004, Director of Coventry Polytechnic 1987–92
 Arnold Goodman, Baron Goodman, Master 1976–86 of University College, Oxford
 Douglas Gough, Professor of Theoretical Astrophysics since 1993 at the University of Cambridge, and Director 1999–2004 of the Institute of Astronomy, Cambridge
 Efraim Halevy, former head of Mossad
 William Harold Hutt, economist, and Professor of Commerce and Dean of the Faculty of Commerce 1931–64 at the University of Cape Town
 Frank Cyril James, Principal and Vice-Chancellor 1939–62 of McGill University, Canada
 Brigadier Sam Janikoun OBE.
 Stanley Joslin, Chief Inspector of Nuclear Installations 1959–64 at the Ministry of Power
 Leon Kossoff, painter
 Stephen Latner, Managing Director 1998–99 of Warburg Dillon Read
 Michael Levy, Baron Levy
 John Lewis, Labour MP 1945–50 for Bolton and 1950–51 for Bolton West
 Ben Lockspeiser, first President of CERN
 Dennis Lyons CB, director 1965–71 of the Road Research Laboratory
 Leonard Millis CBE, director 1939–74 of the British Waterworks Association
 Stephen M. Milner Professor of Plastic and Reconstructive Surgery, Johns Hopkins University School of Medicine, Baltimore, Maryland 1961-1968
 Cyril Offord, Professor of Mathematics 1966–73 at the London School of Economics (LSE)
 Stanley Orman, Director of Missiles 1978–81 at the AWRE, and Chief Weapon System Engineer of Polaris 1981–82
 Fuller Osborn, Chief Executive 1965–78 of Northern Rock Building Society
 Jerry Pam, Hollywood agent and member of the Finance Committee of the Academy of Motion Picture Arts and Sciences; publicist of Sir Michael Caine
 Keith Pavitt, of the Science and Technology Policy Research
 Maurice Peston, Baron Peston of Mile End, English economist, Professor of Economics 1965–88 at Queen Mary College, and father of Robert Peston
 Harold Pinter
 Prof Derek S. Pugh, British psychologist, business theorist and Emeritus Professor of International Management at the Open University Business School (attended 1944–48, evacuated to Northampton during World War II)
 Henry Richardson, film editor
 Lt Col F. J. Roberts, editor of the 'Wipers Times'
 Philip Robinson, executive director, Financial Services Authority 1998–2009
 Norman Rose, biographer of Sir Winston Churchill
 Ralph Shackman, professor of urology 1961–75 at Hammersmith Hospital
 Alfred Sherman, journalist
 Barrie Sherman, trade unionist
 Colin Shindler, first professor of Israeli Studies in the UK, SOAS
 Aubrey Silberston CBE, professor of economics 1978–87 at Imperial College London, and father of Jeremy Silberston
 Barry Supple CBE, professor of economic history 1981–93 University of Cambridge, and a former Director of the Leverhulme Trust, and father of Tim Supple (attended 1942–49)
 Maurice Vile, Professor Emeritus and former Deputy Vice-Chancellor, the University of Kent.
 William Warbey, Labour MP 1945–50 for Luton, and 1953–55 for Broxtowe, and 1955–66 for Ashfield
 Maurice Wohl CBE, businessman
 Henry Woolf, theatre director
 John Yudkin, Professor of Nutrition 1954–71 at Queen Elizabeth College, known for finding links between sugar and coronary heart disease

Grocers' Company's School (1876–1906)
 Cecil J. Allen, author, musician, lecturer, wrote more than 700 articles about locomotives and over 40 books on railways of Europe, attended the Grocer's Company's School circa 1898
 F. Britten Austin, playwright whose book The Drum would be made into The Last Outpost
 Sir Robert Barlow, businessman, former Chairman of the Metal Box Company
 Prof Raymond Wilson Chambers, Quain Professor of English Language and Literature 1922–41 at University College London
 Cecil Vandepeer Clarke (1888–1961) engineer, inventor and soldier.
 Prof Millais Culpin, Professor 1931–39 of Medical-Industrial Psychology at London School of Hygiene & Tropical Medicine

Notes

References

O'Connor, Maureen, et al.  Hackney Downs: The School That Dared to Fight.  London: Cassell, 1999.   (10).   (13).  Print.
Watkins, G. L., ed.  The Clove's Lines: The Newsletter of the Clove Club: The Old Boys of Hackney Downs School.  Print.  (Some issues are accessible online at the website of the Clove Club.)
Watkins, G. L., ed.   'Fortune's Fool': A Life of Joe Brearley: The Man Who Taught Harold Pinter.  Aylesbury, Buckinghamshire, Eng.: TwigBooks, 2008.  Print.

External links
 The Clove Club ("Founded in 1884") – Official website of "The Clove Club: The Old Boys of Hackney Downs School, formerly the Grocers' Company's School – founded by the Company in its corporate right, in 1876."
 Social Change and English, 1945–1965 - Hackney Downs is one of three schools in London that are included in this Leverhulme Trust-funded project about the teaching of English in the period 1945–65. The project is collecting oral histories from former teachers and pupils at the school.

News
 Independent September 1999

Former buildings and structures in the London Borough of Hackney
Defunct schools in the London Borough of Hackney
Defunct grammar schools in England
Educational institutions established in 1876
1876 establishments in England
Educational institutions disestablished in 1995
1995 disestablishments in England